Rajaratnam Selvanayagam (1921 – 26 December 1999) was a Malaysian field hockey player. He competed in the men's tournament at the 1956 Summer Olympics.

References

External links
 

1921 births
1999 deaths
Malaysian male field hockey players
Olympic field hockey players of Malaya
Field hockey players at the 1956 Summer Olympics
People from Perak
Malaysian sportspeople of Indian descent
Malaysian people of Tamil descent